Back to Titanic is the second soundtrack album released for the film, which contains a mixture of previously unreleased recordings and newly recorded performances of some of the songs heard in the film.

After the success of the first soundtrack album, James Horner created a new suite of music, comprising light and dark sections from the score, which represents the "soul" of his music for the film.

Album information
In addition, several of the source numbers from the film were included into this second album. From "Nearer My God to Thee" to the raucous pipe and drum rhythms heard in the Irish folk music played in the lower decks, these selections recreate the most poignant moments in the life and death of the great ship.

"Alexander's Ragtime Band" was played on the deck by Wallace Hartley's small orchestra and lifted spirits as the ship settled, lights blazing, into black oblivion. And "Come Josephine, in My Flying Machine", which Jack Dawson briefly sings for Rose DeWitt Bukater and Rose sings when she is waiting to be rescued in the freezing seas, was a top hit song the year before the sinking.

Commercial performance
Although it did not manage to reach the success of its counterpart soundtrack, Back to Titanic was a commercial success. 

It debuted at No. 7 on the Billboard 200 and then the following week reached its peak position at No. 2 with 164,000 copies sold. Back to Titanic has been certified Platinum in the United States for sales of over 1 million copies. It was also certified gold in Japan for 100,000 copies shipped to stores in September 1998.

In 2012, the album was re-issued with its predecessor as part of the Collector's Anniversary Edition for the 3D re-release of the film.

Track listing
Music composed and conducted by James Horner, except where noted.

Note
 Track 1 and 13 performed by the London Symphony Orchestra and the Choristers of King's College, Cambridge.
 Track 10 performed by the London Symphony Orchestra.

Charts

Weekly charts

Year-end charts

Certifications

References

External links
 

James Horner albums
1998 soundtrack albums
Titanic (1997 film)
Sequel albums